Habib Faisal  is an Indian filmmaker and lyricist. He is best known for directing Do Dooni Chaar (2010) and Ishaqzaade (2012).

Career
He made his directorial debut, Do Dooni Chaar, for which he won Filmfare Award for Best Dialogue. He co-wrote Siddharth Anand's Salaam Namaste. He also wrote director Shaad Ali's Jhoom Barabar Jhoom starring Abhishek Bachchan and Preity Zinta, and Siddharth Anand's Ta Ra Rum Pum starring Saif Ali Khan and Rani Mukherjee. All three are Yashraj films. He also wrote Band Baaja Baaraat which was released in late 2010.

Faisal then went on to direct his second film, Ishaqzaade, starring debutant Arjun Kapoor, and Parineeti Chopra in their first lead film, which released on 11 May 2012. The film received positive response from critics, and managed to do very well at the box office, turning out to be a worldwide hit. He then wrote Bewakoofiyaan, which was directed by Nupur Asthana and featured Ayushmann Khurrana, Sonam Kapoor, and Rishi Kapoor. His next directorial venture was Daawat-e-Ishq, which had actors Aditya Roy Kapur and Parineeti Chopra in lead roles. Daawat-e-Ishq released worldwide on 19 September 2014.

Faisal's fourth film, Qaidi Band was released on 25 August 2017.

An alumnus of Jamia Millia Islamia, he has directed the television serials kareena kareena and worked in New Delhi as a camera person with NDTV.

Discography

Filmography
 2021: Dil Bekaraar (Director and additional dialogues)
 2020: Aashram(Hindi web series) (writer)
 2018: Raju Gadu (Telugu film) (writer, alongside Maruthi)
 2018: Home (director, an ALTBalaji Original Series)
 2017: Qaidi Band (writer and director)  
 2016: Fan (writer)  
 2014: Daawat-e-Ishq (writer and director)
 2014: Bewakoofiyaan (writer) 
 2012: Ishaqzaade ( director)
 2011: Ladies vs Ricky Bahl (dialogue)
 2010: Band Baaja Baaraat (screenplay and dialogue)
 2010: Do Dooni Chaar (writer and director)
 2007: Jhoom Barabar Jhoom (writer)
 2007: Ta Ra Rum Pum (screenplay and dialogue)
 1996: Opus 27 (short)
 1992: Electric Moon (assistant director)

Awards

References

External links

 

Indian male screenwriters
Jamia Millia Islamia alumni
Living people
Hindi-language film directors
Filmfare Awards winners
20th-century Indian film directors
21st-century Indian film directors
Film directors from Mumbai
Year of birth missing (living people)